The Battle of the Bay of Velez was a naval battle between the forces of Salah Reis and a Portuguese flotilla in which the forces of Salah Reis emerged victorious.

During the winter of 1552-1553 in Algiers, this time was devoted to outfitting a fleet. In the beginning of June, Salah Reis embarked from Algiers and set out with a fleet of 40 vessels, galliots, galleys and brigantines.

On July 5 1553 while at sea with his squadron, Salah Reis came across and defeated a Portuguese fleet at the bay of Velez. The entire flotilla and caravels were captured and the Portuguese, Moroccans and all were taken captive and brought to the Velez.

The booty was apparently offered to the Saadi ruler as a token of friendship and neighbourliness and also to dissuade him from launching raids on Oran. Despite this offer a new border incident had occurred and Salah Reis spent his winter preparing an expedition against Morocco, after which he would defeat the Saadi ruler in the Battle of Taza.

References

Battles involving Portugal
Battles involving the Ottoman Empire
Naval battles involving the Ottoman Empire
Naval battles of the Ottoman–Portuguese conflicts
Naval battles involving Portugal
Conflicts in 1553
1553 in the Ottoman Empire